Calanesia is a genus of moth in the family Cosmopterigidae. It contains only one species, Calanesia karsholti, which is found in Tunisia, North Africa.

Adults have been recorded in March.

References
Natural History Museum Lepidoptera genus database

Cosmopterigidae
Monotypic moth genera
Moths of Africa